Shawn Alex Thompson (born January 13, 1958, Berwick, Nova Scotia is a Canadian actor, screenwriter, television producer, and television director, as well as a professional magician. Notably he is one of the producers of Puppets Who Kill, which aired on Canada's The Comedy Network.

Thompson's first foray into showbiz came as a magician and circus performer, dangling by his ankles from a burning rope while struggling to escape from a straight jacket. From those early, auspicious beginnings, Shawn migrated into stand-up comedy, first taking a stance at Yuk Yuks, alongside prominent actor Jim Carrey. During this time Thompson guest hosted eleven times on The Late Show Starring Joan Rivers for Fox Television. Also on Fox, Shawn became a series regular on the sketch comedy series The Newz, where he also wrote and directed several short films.  From December 1985 to April 1987, Shawn Thompson was cast as Simon Hall, a fictional character on the CBS series Guiding Light. It was the first daytime role for the Canadian born actor. 

Simultaneously during this period, Thompson also hosted the Toronto regional edition of the CBC Television teen-oriented weekend talk/variety show Switchback, as well as appearing alongside Howard Busgang in the short-run comedy series We Don't Knock, in which Busgang and Thompson performed improvised pranks on real people. In 1985 Thompson was arrested in the United States for illegal dumping after throwing a doll over Niagara Falls as part of a Switchback stunt.

In 1988, he played dance television host Corny Collins in John Waters' film Hairspray. He has directed episodes of the series Puppets Who Kill, winning a Canadian Comedy Award for Best Director in 2003, and a Gemini Award for Best Direction in 2004.
Furthermore, in 1995, Thompson wrote episodes for MGM's “The Outer Limits”, one of which episodes included a young Josh Brolin.

Recently, he has directed shows such as The Next Step and Murdoch Mysteries, and is currently acting in "My Perfect Landing" for BBC kids.

References

External links

Canadian male film actors
Film directors from Nova Scotia
Canadian male television actors
Canadian television directors
Canadian television producers
Living people
Male actors from Nova Scotia
1958 births
Canadian Comedy Award winners